Greg Dowd (19 March 1946 – 27 July 2002) was  a former Australian rules footballer who played with Footscray in the Victorian Football League (VFL).

Notes

External links 
		

1946 births
2002 deaths
Australian rules footballers from Victoria (Australia)
Western Bulldogs players
East Ballarat Football Club players